Gadarmala, also known as Bhopalgarh, is a taluk in Bhilwara district, Rajasthan.
It is situated approximately 20 km away from Bhilwara.
It is a small village with a population of about 5,000 people.

History 
The village is named after the King Bhopal Singh, an adopted son of king Kesar Singh.  The monument of the king has been sold to one of the person of the village and is now not open for tourists.

Gadarmala is a thikana (titled estate or jagir) held by the descendants of Puranmal, the eleventh son of Maharana Pratap Singh I (1572–1597).  Their title is Baba.  The parent house was Mangrop (Magrop), which was given to Puranmal.  Two generations later, Puranmal's grandson, Mohkam Singh, received the village of Gurla as a jagir from his father, Nath Singh of Mangrop. Mohkam Singh gave one of his sons, Amar Singh, the jagir of Gadarmala, which is an offshoot of Gurla.

Administration
Gadarmala has a gram panchayat consisting of small villages such as Chawanderi, Dholikhera, Nogawa.

References

External links
 Mewar History

Villages in Bhilwara district